The 2012 Recopa Sudamericana (officially the 2012 Recopa Santander Sudamericana for sponsorship reasons) was the 20th edition of the Recopa Sudamericana, the football competition organized by CONMEBOL between the winners of the previous season's two major South American club tournaments, the Copa Libertadores and the Copa Sudamericana. It was contested between Brazilian club Santos, the 2011 Copa Libertadores champion, and Chilean club Universidad de Chile, the 2011 Copa Sudamericana champion.

After a goalless first leg, Santos was crowned champions after their 2–0 victory in the second leg. Neymar of Santos was selected as the player of the 2012 Recopa Sudamericana.

Rules
The Recopa Sudamericana was played over two legs; home and away. The team that qualified via the Copa Libertadores played the second leg at home. The team that accumulated the most points —three for a win, one for a draw, zero for a loss— after the two legs was crowned the champion. In case of the two teams tied on points after the second leg, the team with the best goal difference won. If the two teams had equal goal difference, the away goals rule was not applied. Extra time was played, which consisted of two 15-minute halves. If the tie was still not broken, a penalty shootout ensued according to the Laws of the Game.

Qualified teams

Venues

Match details

First leg

Second leg

References

2012 in South American football
2012
Santos FC matches
Club Universidad de Chile matches
Rec
Rec